Danielle Anne Trussoni is a New York Times, USA Today, and Sunday Times Top 10 bestselling novelist. She has been a Pulitzer Prize in Fiction jurist, and writes the "Dark Matters" column for the New York Times Book Review. She created the Writerly podcast, a weekly podcast about the art and business of writing. Her novels have been translated into 33 languages.

Her work includes five books: Falling Through the Earth (2006), Angelology (2010), Angelopolis (2012), The Fortress (2016), and The Ancestor (2020). She is the recipient of the Michener-Copernicus Society of America award, the Dana Award in the novel, and The New York Times Top 10 Book of the Year for her first book. In addition to being published in The New York Times Book Review, she has also been published in The Guardian, The New York Times Magazine, and Tin House, her writings have been widely anthologized.

Background
She is of Italian descent and grew up in La Crosse, Wisconsin. Trussoni graduated from the University of Wisconsin–Madison summa cum laude and Phi Beta Kappa with a BA in history and English in 1996 and from the Iowa Writers' Workshop, where she received an MFA in fiction writing in 2002. She has lived for extended periods in Japan, Bulgaria, England, and France.

Trussoni currently lives in New York. She lived in France from 2009 to 2012 and her memoir, The Fortress, focuses on this period. She married the French filmmaker Hadrien Royo in 2016 in Brittany.

Writing

The Puzzle Master series

Trussoni's latest books, The Puzzle Master and The Puzzle Box, were bought in a two-book pre-empt from Andrea Walker at Random House in 2022. There was significant foreign rights interest, and subsequently both books have now been purchased in Spain, France, Germany, Romania, Greece, Japan.

The Puzzle Master blends historical research with fictional elements. The setting ranges from an upstate New York women's prison to nineteenth-century Prague to the secrets of the Pierpont Morgan Library, featuring a celebrated puzzle constructor who is thrust into a mystery involving an ancient religious cypher, one that will unlock shocking secrets about the universe, technology, and the fate of humankind.

The Puzzle Box is the follow up to The Puzzle Master and will be released by Random House.

The Ancestor

The Ancestor, a literary gothic novel that explores the darker realms of ancestry and inheritance, was published by William Morrow in April 2020. The book has been widely praised, described by Kirkus Reviews as "an opulently romantic horror tale" and "gothic extravaganza". Publishers Weekly called it "an intense, darkly gothic narrative with elements of mystery, the paranormal, and legendary tales". The Ancestor is currently in development as a film at Anonymous Content with Mark Romanek set to direct.

Angelology series

Trussoni's first novel, Angelology (Viking Press, 2010) was a literary historical thriller described as a "tapestry of myth and biblical lore on our present-day world and plunged two star-crossed heroes into an ancient battle against mankind's greatest enemy: the fatally attractive angel-human hybrids known as the Nephilim".

Angelology received a great deal of attention prior to publication. Seven publishing houses vied for the publishing rights, resulting in a bidding war. Angelology went on to become a New York Times international bestseller and has been translated into over 30 languages.

Angelopolis, the follow up to Angelology, was a New York Times bestseller and was described as "stunning" and "a must-read" by Booklist. Part historical novel, fantasy, love story, thriller, and mystery, it is a continuation of Angelology from the perspective of Verlaine.

A third book in the series will be published.

Crypto-Z

Trussoni is the co-creator with Hadrien Royo of the Crypto-Z audio drama podcast, a companion to The Ancestor. Crypto-Z is the story of agent Jane Silver and her partner Felix Bright as they hunt down cryptids. The Crypto-Z world originated when Trussoni was conducting research for her novel The Ancestor and evolved into a scripted audio series, produced in 2019 and early 2020 with voice actors and production team members in New York City,  London, and Los Angeles.

Upon release, the podcast landed on Apple's Top 10 list of fiction podcasts. The second and third seasons of the podcast are currently in production, and a game is also in development.

Bibliography
 Falling Through The Earth, Henry Holt and Company, 2006, .
 Angelology, Viking Press, 2010, .
 Angelopolis,  Viking Press, 2013, 
 The Fortress, Dey Street/Harper Collins, 2016, 
 The Ancestor,  William Morrow/Harper Colliins, 2020 
 The Puzzle Master,  Random House, 2023

Reviews
 O, The Oprah Magazine, 29 Best Gothic Novels of All Time, October 21, 2020
Goodreads, 2020's Top Horror Novels, October 5, 2020
New York Times, You're Descended From Royalty. Here Are the Keys To Your Castle., Carol Goodman, April 7, 2020
 New York Times: Sunday Book Review, Cracked, Helene Wecker, May 3, 2013
 NPR, Angelology: A Cross-Bred Monster Of A Mystery, Jane Ciabattari, March 11, 2010
 Time, Angelology: Wings of Desire, Lev Grossman, March 15, 2010
 New York Times: Sunday Book Review, Fallen Angels, Susann Cokal, March 3, 2010
 New York Times: Books, The War at Home, Kathryn Harrison, March 12, 2006
 USA Today, 'Angelology': A heaven-sent supernatural thrill ride, Carol Memmott, March 12, 2010
 Elle Book Release: Angelology, Natasha Clark, March 12, 2010

References

External links
 
 Harrison, Kathryn (March 12, 2006). "The War at Home". The New York Times.
 Danielle Trussoni Angelology Interview
 Writing Workshops
 Harrison, Kathryn (March 12, 2006). "The War at Home". The New York Times.
 Falling Through the Earth Top 10 Book of 2006
 Angelology sale
 The New York Times Book Review, October 26
 The New York Times Book Review, March 28 
 The New York Times Book Review, May 23

21st-century American memoirists
Novelists from Iowa
Iowa Writers' Workshop alumni
Living people
Writers from La Crosse, Wisconsin
University of Wisconsin–Madison College of Letters and Science alumni
American women memoirists
Place of birth missing (living people)
Year of birth missing (living people)
21st-century American novelists
21st-century American women writers
Novelists from Wisconsin
American women novelists